is a song by Japanese voice actress idol unit Earphones. It was released on February 15, 2017 and was used as the opening for the anime, Akiba's Trip: The Animation. The song has spoken verses narrated by Akira Kushida. Ikken Rakuchaku Goyoujin and single's B-side, Utopia Monogatari were featured on their 2nd studio album, Some Dreams.

Music video
The music video for "Ikken Rakuchaku Goyoujin" was directed by Pink ja Nakutemo. The video features Earphones performed with light stick and background of Akihabara. Akira Kushida also appears in the music video.

Track listing

Charts

Release history

References 

Earphones (band) songs
2017 singles
2017 songs
Anime songs